Nancy H. Kleinbaum (born 30 August 1948) is an American writer and journalist. She is the author of the novel Dead Poets Society, which is based on the movie of the same name. She lives in Mount Kisco, New York.

Bibliography
 D.A.R.Y.L. (1985, based on a script by David Ambrose, Allan Scott and Jeffrey Ellis)
 Growing Pains (1987)
 Dead Poets Society (1989, based on a script by Tom Schulman)
 Cop and a Half (1993, based on a script by Arne Olsen)
 Ghost Story (1995, based on a script by Kermit Frazier)
 The Magnificent Seven. The Authorized Story of American Gold (1996)
 Dr. Dolittle (1998, by Hugh Lofting)
 Doctor Dolittle and his Animal Family (1999, by Hugh Lofting)
 Doctor Dolittle and Tommy Stubbins (1999, by Hugh Lofting)
 Doctor Dolittle Meets the Pushmi-Pullyu (1999, by Hugh Lofting)
 Doctor Dolittle's Journey (1999, by Hugh Lofting)

References

1948 births
Living people
People from Mount Kisco, New York
American women journalists
20th-century American women writers
21st-century American women writers
20th-century American non-fiction writers
21st-century American non-fiction writers